Maclay's Twin Bridge (West) is a historic multi-span stone arch bridge spanning a tributary of Conodoguinet Creek between Lurgan Township and Southampton Township in Franklin County, Pennsylvania. It was constructed in 1827 and is a twin of McClay's Twin Bridge (East).

The bridge was listed on the National Register of Historic Places in 1988.

See also
List of bridges documented by the Historic American Engineering Record in Pennsylvania
Maclay's Mill

References

External links

Road bridges on the National Register of Historic Places in Pennsylvania
Bridges completed in 1827
Bridges in Franklin County, Pennsylvania
Historic American Engineering Record in Pennsylvania
National Register of Historic Places in Franklin County, Pennsylvania
1827 establishments in Pennsylvania
Stone arch bridges in the United States